Beirut Times is an independent, cultural, social and political newspaper weekly American publication published in Pasadena, California in Arabic and English serving the Lebanese-American and the Arab-American communities. It was established in 1985. The paper has correspondents posted in a number of Arab capitals and Europe.

External links
Official website

Arab-American culture in California
Lebanese-American culture in California
Arabic-language newspapers published in the United States
Newspapers established in 1985
Non-English-language newspapers published in California
1985 establishments in California